West Plains Bank Building is a historic bank building located at West Plains, Howell County, Missouri. It was built in 1883, and is a narrow two-story, three bay, brick commercial building with Italianate style design elements.  It features a wide pressed metal cornice runs the width of the facade.  It has two rear additions; one built about 1913 and the other about 1923.  It is located next to the W. J. and Ed Smith Building.

It was listed on the National Register of Historic Places in 2001.  It is also located in the Courthouse Square Historic District, which was NRHP-listed in 2003.

References

Individually listed contributing properties to historic districts on the National Register in Missouri
Bank buildings on the National Register of Historic Places in Missouri
Italianate architecture in Missouri
Commercial buildings completed in 1883
Buildings and structures in Howell County, Missouri
National Register of Historic Places in Howell County, Missouri
1883 establishments in Missouri